Koziarnia  is a village in the administrative district of Gmina Krzeszów, within Nisko County, Subcarpathian Voivodeship, in south-eastern Poland.

The village has a population of 616.

References

Koziarnia